Kaniehtiio Alexandra Jessie Horn (née Batt; ; born November 8, 1986), sometimes credited to as Tiio Horn, is a Canadian actress. She was nominated for a Gemini Award for her role in the television film Moccasin Flats: Redemption and she has appeared in the films The Trotsky, Leslie, My Name Is Evil, and The Wild Hunt, as well as the streaming television horror series Hemlock Grove and the sitcoms 18 to Life and Letterkenny.

Early life
Horn was born in Ottawa and grew up in Ottawa and on the Kahnawake Mohawk reserve outside of Montreal. Her mother, Kahn-Tineta Horn, is a Mohawk former model and a political activist for the Kahnawake First Nation. Her father, who is of German and Scottish descent, is a lawyer. Horn, her mother and her older half-sister Waneek (later a broadcaster and co-captain of the Canadian women's water polo team at the 2000 Sydney Olympics) were notable participants in the 1990 Oka Crisis. Waneek was stabbed in the chest by a soldier wielding a bayonet while holding Horn, who was then aged four; a photograph of the incident, published on the front page of newspapers, symbolized the standoff between Mohawks and the Canadian government.

Horn decided to be an actress at a young age, but concentrated on swimming and water polo as a teenager. She graduated from Dawson College in 2005 for theatre arts, and appeared in a number of short films.

Career
Horn's first film acting credit was in 2006 for the CBC television mini-series Indian Summer: The Oka Crisis (for which she had been present at the real-life event sixteen years earlier).

Horn landed a role in the 2007 drama film The Colony, directed by Jeff Barnaby. In 2008, she appeared in the TV film Moccasin Flats: Redemption and was nominated for a Gemini Award for her role. She also appeared in Journey to the Center of the Earth that year, also starring Brendan Fraser.

In 2009, Horn starred in The Trotsky, directed by  Jacob Tierney, playing a Montreal high school student. In Web of Lies, a TV movie about a cybersecurity specialist accused of fraud, she played a hacker named Spider. She appeared in The Wild Hunt, directed by Alexandre Franchi and in Reginald Harkema's Leslie, My Name Is Evil as a member of Charles Manson's death cult. The three Canadian films were selected for the Festival du Nouveau Cinéma. The Trotsky and The Wild Hunt made the Top 10 Canadian films list at the 2009 Toronto International Film Festival.

Horn starred in the CBC television sitcom 18 to Life as Monica Bellow. The series was picked up by the CW network and it aired in the US in August 2010. Horn filmed a second season in Montreal in mid-2010.

Horn voiced several roles in By the Rapids, an APTN cartoon which she had made in collaboration with Joseph Tekaroniake Lazare. She also shot an APTN television pilot, Escape Hatch, with Mohawk writer-director Tracey Deer. In 2010, Horn again worked with Jacob Tierney in the film Good Neighbours. She starred in the low-budget slasher film A Flesh Offering, directed by Jeremy Torrie, playing an artist who gets lost in the woods.
 
In 2011, Horn starred in the horror anthology film The Theatre Bizarre, and played a priestess in Immortals. She filmed Penthouse North with Michelle Monaghan and Michael Keaton and shot a CBC comedy pilot. In 2012, Horn joined the cast of the Netflix drama Hemlock Grove as Destiny Rumancek, a Romani witch. She starred opposite Famke Janssen, Dougray Scott, Bill Skarsgård, Landon Liboiron and Lili Taylor in the series.

Horn voiced the role of Kaniehtí:io, the Native American protagonist's (Ratohnhake:ton) Mohawk mother, in the 2012 video game Assassin's Creed III, developed by Ubisoft. That same year, she wrote and directed her debut film, The Smoke Shack, in association with the National Screen Institute. In 2013, Horn played Rynn, an Irathient Spirit Rider, on the Syfy TV series, Defiance, and played Dorothy from The Wizard of Oz in "Slumber Party", an episode of the CW series Supernatural. She also appeared in Embrace of the Vampire starring Sharon Hinnendael, a remake of the 1995 horror film of the same name, in the television special Gavin Crawford's Wild West and in the Amazon series The Man in the High Castle (TV Series).  

Horn appears in a recurring role as Tanis in the CraveTV series Letterkenny, for which she won the Canadian Screen Award for Best Supporting Actress in a Comedy Series at the 10th Canadian Screen Awards in 2022. 

In 2020, Horn appeared as a panelist on Canada Reads advocating for Eden Robinson's novel Son of a Trickster.

In 2022, Horn appeared in a recurring role as Feather Day in season 2 of the Peacock series, Rutherford Falls.

Filmography

Film

Television

Video games

References

External links
 
 

1986 births
Canadian film actresses
Canadian television actresses
Living people
Canadian Mohawk people
Canadian people of Scottish descent
Canadian people of German descent
Anglophone Quebec people
Dawson College alumni
Actresses from Quebec
People from Montérégie
First Nations actresses
Native American actresses
21st-century Canadian actresses
21st-century First Nations people
Actresses from Ottawa
Mohawks of Kahnawá:ke
Best Supporting Actress in a Comedy Series Canadian Screen Award winners